Anatoliy Oleksandrovych Tymoshchuk (born 30 March 1979) is a Ukrainian football coach and a former midfielder, currently an assistant coach of the Russian Premier League club Zenit Saint Petersburg (since 2017). Tymoshchuk is regarded as one of the greatest players in the history of Shakhtar Donetsk and Zenit Saint Petersburg, and is also a former captain of the Ukraine national team.

Tymoshchuk began his professional career with his local Volyn Lutsk. He moved to play for Ukrainian giants Shakhtar Donetsk, which he captained and won the Ukrainian Premier League, Ukrainian Cup and Ukrainian Super Cup titles with. In 2008, Tymoshchuk won the UEFA Cup and the UEFA Super Cup as captain of Zenit Saint Petersburg. He also won a Russian Premier League and Russian Super Cup title. After joining German club Bayern Munich, Tymoshchuk won the Bundesliga, DFB-Pokal and the DFB-Supercup titles. With Bayern, he also won the UEFA Champions League in 2013 and finished as runners-up in 2010 and 2012.

A former captain of the Ukraine national team, Tymoshchuk is the nation's all-time most capped player with 144 caps. He took part in Ukraine's first-ever FIFA World Cup in 2006 and their first European Championship in 2012. He won the Ukrainian Footballer of the Year on three occasions.

In 2022, the Ukrainian Association of Football stripped Tymoshchuk of his (Ukrainian) coaching license and titles because he did not speak out against Russia's ongoing invasion of Ukraine and stayed on as assistant coach at Zenit Saint Petersburg. On 6 January 2023 he was formally sanctioned by Ukraine among other Russian and pro-Russian celebrities, having his assets frozen and state awards revoked.

Club career

Volyn Lutsk

Tymoshchuk started his career playing for his hometown club Volyn Lutsk, having risen through the ranks at the team. Following two successful seasons, the player began to attract attention from bigger clubs.

Shakhtar Donetsk
In 1997, at age 18, Tymoshchuk's contract was purchased from Volyn by Shakhtar Donetsk. At Shakhtar, he was a key member of the team which won three Ukrainian Premier League titles, three Ukrainian Cups and a Ukrainian Super Cup. His time with Shakhtar is credited with establishing him as a great midfielder in Europe.

In 2006, having captained Shakhtar for a number of years, Tymoshchuk became linked with a string of European clubs, including Juventus, Feyenoord, Celtic and Roma.

Zenit Saint Petersburg

On 27 February 2007, Tymoshchuk transferred to Zenit Saint Petersburg for a reported €15 million fee. He was soon named as the new captain of the team. Zenit manager Dick Advocaat was very impressed with him, saying, "About Tymoshchuk I can say only good things, and not only the player but also the person. Tymoshchuk – is a professional from head to toes. I never had complaints to him about discipline. While Tymoshchuk and I are at the club, he will be the captain of Zenit."

His first season at the club ended in success, with Zenit winning the Russian Premier League title for the first time in club history and the club's first league title since its 1984 Soviet Top League triumph. At the end of the season, Tymoshchuk was included in the annual list of the best 33 players of the Premier League, and was also voted as league player of the year by popular sports magazine Sport-Express.

After Zenit won the championship, astronaut Yuri Malenchenko—known as a fan of the team—waved Zenit shirt with Tymoshchuk's name on it while in space. In so doing, Zenit became the first team to have its uniform shown in space.

During the 2007–08 European season, Tymoshchuk captained Zenit to the UEFA Cup title, in which they defeated Scottish Premier League club Rangers 2–0 in the final. The club then went on to claim the 2008 UEFA Super Cup in a 2–1 victory over Manchester United.

Bayern Munich

In February 2009, Bayern Munich general manager Uli Hoeneß announced Tymoshchuk had agreed to join Bayern. Initially, Zenit announced no agreement had yet been reached between the two clubs. However, on 18 February, Bayern announced Tymoshchuk would join the club in July 2009 in order to allow Tymoshchuk to play for Zenit until the summer. He played his last match with Zenit on 14 June 2009.

Tymoshchuk officially joined Bayern on 1 July 2009 with a contract set to expire 30 June 2012. The transfer fee was undisclosed, but German media reports estimated the deal at €14 million.

Tymoshchuk played his first match for Bayern against Milan in the 2009 Audi Cup, coming on as a second-half substitute. He also started in the final against Manchester United, where he was substituted off in the 77th minute; Bayern won the match 7–6 on penalties. He scored his first goal for Bayern against Juventus in the 2009–10 UEFA Champions League. On 8 May 2010, Tymoshchuk won his first trophy with Bayern, the 2009–10 Bundesliga, followed one week later by the 2009–10 DFB-Pokal title. In total, Tymoshchuk made 21 Bundesliga appearances in the 2009–10 season, ten as a substitute, but failed to start a match in the whole of the second half of the season.

In late July 2010, Bayern manager Louis van Gaal described Tymoshchuk's prospects as "not very bright", adding, "If a player doesn't play or doesn't have bright prospects then I would leave if I were them." Nevertheless, from October 2010 until March 2011, Tymoshchuk started all of Bayern's matches.

In 2011, new Bayern manager Jupp Heynckes said Tymoshchuk would play more under him. Tymoshchuk was given a chance to start in matches at the time the team was plagued with injuries, filling in at central defence. He started in central defence alongside Jérôme Boateng in the Champions League final in Munich, which Bayern lost to Chelsea on penalties. Before the final, Heynckes said, "Tymoshchuk is a great team player. He's really important for us, and in situation, when three players are disqualified, his experience and ability to play in different positions is really useful for us." Because Tymoshchuk played a bigger role under Heynckes than under Van Gaal, he became an important part of the team. Goalkeeper Manuel Neuer said of Tymoshchuk, "For me the main job – not to let goals in. As a result, I love partners who have the same job. Anatoliy – is quite an aggressive footballer, but it's a smart aggression. He knows perfectly, when to choose the right position, to stop the attack of the opponent, and when to use such a move, like taking the ball harshly. No doubt, Tymoshchuk is doing a great job at Bayern!"

Return to Zenit Saint Petersburg

After winning the 2012–13 Champions League with Bayern, Tymoshchuk returned to Zenit, despite receiving offers from different clubs around Europe. Russian media claim Tymoshchuk was signed by Zenit not only because of his skills as player, but for his ability to integrate the Russians and the foreigners in the team and stop the rumoured conflicts among groups in the squad. Tymoshchuk himself said the return to Zenit was the last transfer in his career, indicating he would finish his playing career with the club.

In 2014, Zenit lost 4–2 to Borussia Dortmund, with Dortmund scoring twice in the first five minutes of the match. Tymoshchuk has said there was a chance for his team to score when the scoreline was 3–2, but they never did.

Kairat
On 6 July 2015, Tymoshchuk signed an 18-month contract with Kazakhstan Premier League side Kairat. He captained the team in his league debut. He helped the team to its 2015 Kazakhstan Cup title. Tymoshchuk left Kairat upon the completion of his contract in November 2016. Without officially announcing his retirement, he began studying for his PRO coaching license.

International career

Since his debut in 2000, Tymoshchuk has become a key member of the Ukraine national team. He gained recognition for his performance during the 2006 FIFA World Cup in which Ukraine reached the quarter-finals, being named man of the match in Ukraine's victory over Tunisia. Tymoshchuk has been described as one of the catalysts for Ukraine's first World Cup appearance. In 2009, he won Cyprus International Football Tournaments.

On 11 October 2010, in a friendly match against Brazil, Tymoshchuk became the second Ukraine player to earn 100 caps, after Andriy Shevchenko, who reached the milestone in a friendly against Canada just two days prior.

On 20 December 2011, Tymoshchuk was named the best footballer in the history of Ukraine; he finished first in a nationwide poll to determine the key individuals in the Ukrainian game since the nation's independence in 1991. After Shevchenko's retirement in 2012, Tymoshchuk inherited the captaincy of the team.

He is the most capped Ukrainian player with 144 appearances as of 29 June 2016. In August 2016, Tymoshchuk officially retired from international football.

Style of play 
During his playing career, he was "a deep-lying midfielder who is comfortable on the ball and capable of ferocious long-range shooting".

Personal life
Tymoshchuk is married to Nadiya Tymoshchuk (née Navrotska). The couple met in his hometown Lutsk while living in the same neighbourhood. Their twins were born three months prematurely in April 2010. In July, it was determined the children were growing well and would be released from hospital. In summer 2016, Nadiya, who currently lives in Munich together with children, announced she was filing for divorce.

In June 2008, Tymoshchuk was awarded the title of "Honorary citizen of Lutsk".

Tymoshchuk's favorite player is Lothar Matthäus and he admitted the historical team in which he most wanted to play with was the Germany national team in 1990, alongside Matthäus. He is also a fan of the Ukrainian band Okean Elzy and Russian painter Mikhail Vrubel. He is an avid collector of wines, t-shirts and icons.

Tymoshchuk's lucky number is four. He can speak Ukrainian, Polish, Russian, some basic Croatian and German.

Tymoshchuk and his father have since 2000 organized tournaments, the International Anatoliy Tymoshchuk Junior Cup, for children from Ukraine and neighbour states in Lutsk. The winners get cups and money awards. The mission of the tournament was to encourage children to continue their football training by giving them a chance to participate in a real competition.

Tymoshchuk has twice played on Zinedine Zidane's team at charity matches, an experience he truly enjoyed.

Zenit controversy 
On 11 March 2022, the Ukrainian Association of Football (UAF) stripped Tymoshchuk of his (Ukrainian) coaching licence and titles because of his role at Zenit St Petersburg and for not speaking against Russia's ongoing invasion of Ukraine. The UAF stated that his "conscious choice" to continue at Zenit "damages the image of Ukrainian football". Reports also surfaced suggesting he might be a Russian spy. A Polish sport commentator described his case as that of  "a collaborator, erased from Ukrainian sport history". No evidence has been presented to support the claims against Tymoshchuk other than his lack of comment on the war.

Utkin Controversy 
When criticising Tymoshchuk, Russian sports journalist Vasily Utkin said that "[Tymoshchuk] cares only and exclusively about money," and claimed that whilst a player for Zenit, he asked the club for large numbers of tickets with the purpose of reselling them. However, that story was quickly disproved by others. Former Zenit player Vladislav Radimov called it "complete nonsense" and provided a story how Tymoshchuk at one point gave him two tickets to a game, but refused to take money from him for those tickets. Russian sports journalist Alexey Andronov also spoke out in defence of Tymoshchuk, and said how at one point Tymoshchuk gave him and another journalist tickets to a game, but did not take any money from them for those tickets. He also pointed out how players requesting tickets from their club for friends is a normal practice in Russia, but unheard of in other European leagues.

Career statistics

Club

International

As of match played 21 June 2016. Ukraine score listed first, score column indicates score after each Tymoshchuk goal.

Honours
Shakhtar Donetsk-2
 Ukrainian Second League: 1997–98

Shakhtar Donetsk
Ukrainian Premier League: 2001–02, 2004–05, 2005–06
Ukrainian Cup: 2000–01, 2001–02, 2003–04
Ukrainian Super Cup: 2005

Zenit Saint Petersburg
Russian Premier League: 2007, 2014–15
Russian Super Cup: 2008
UEFA Cup: 2007–08
UEFA Super Cup: 2008

Bayern Munich
Bundesliga: 2009–10, 2012–13 
DFB-Pokal: 2009–10, 2012–13
DFL-Supercup: 2010, 2012
UEFA Champions League: 2012–13

Kairat
Kazakhstan Cup: 2015
Kazakhstan Super Cup: 2016
Individual
Ukrainian Bravery Order III Degree: 2006
Ukrainian Footballer of the Year (by Ukrainian Football): 2002, 2006, 2007
Russian Premier League: Player of the Year 2007
Russian Premier League Top 33 Players – #1 Defensive Midfielder: 2007, 2008
Honorary citizen of Lutsk: 2008
UEFA awards 100 caps: 2011
Best Ukrainian Footballer in History (1991–2011) with Andriy Shevchenko and Oleksandr Shovkovskyi

See also 
 List of men's footballers with 100 or more international caps

References

External links

Official website 
Profile on Bayern Munich official website

Tymoshchuk statistics in Shakhtar 

 
 

1979 births
Living people
Footballers from Lutsk
Ukrainian footballers
Association football central defenders
Association football midfielders
FC Volyn Lutsk players
FC Shakhtar Donetsk players
FC Shakhtar-2 Donetsk players
FC Zenit Saint Petersburg players
FC Bayern Munich footballers
FC Kairat players
Ukrainian Premier League players
Ukrainian First League players
Ukrainian Second League players
Ukrainian Amateur Football Championship players
Russian Premier League players
Bundesliga players
Kazakhstan Premier League players
UEFA Champions League winning players
UEFA Cup winning players
Ukraine under-21 international footballers
Ukraine international footballers
2006 FIFA World Cup players
UEFA Euro 2012 players
UEFA Euro 2016 players
FIFA Century Club
Ukrainian expatriate footballers
Ukrainian expatriate sportspeople in Russia
Ukrainian expatriate sportspeople in Germany
Ukrainian expatriate sportspeople in Kazakhstan
Expatriate footballers in Russia
Expatriate footballers in Germany
Expatriate footballers in Kazakhstan
FC Zenit Saint Petersburg non-playing staff
Ukrainian football managers
Ukrainian expatriate football managers
Expatriate football managers in Russia